The Powell Brothers is a Country music recording artist from Kingwood, Texas. The group was formed by brothers Taylor and Blake Powell in February 2014.

Background 
Blake and Taylor Powell are both multi-instrumentalists. They first toured together in 2006 as a hired backing musicians, and continued to play as such until Blake graduated from Kingwood High School in 2007, and Taylor in 2010. Post-graduation, both of the brothers briefly attended Berklee College of Music. In their individual careers, the brothers have worked as songwriters, producers, band members, music directors, and session players for more than 30 artists internationally, including: Drew Cline, Grace Pettis, Granger Smith, Haley Cole, Jon Wolfe, Sam Riggs and the Night People, Tucker Jameson, Shane Smith And The Saints, and Will Makar. In February 2014 they were both on the verge of pursuing separate careers on opposite sides of the United States, but instead, decided to form The Powell Brothers and focus on making their own music.

In June 2016, Chad W. Tolar, Esq. joined the team and was named a partner in Powell Brothers Productions, along with Taylor Powell and Blake Powell. The three partners also formed Tolar Powell Entertainment, LLC, a booking and management company based in McAllen, Texas.

The group has shared the stage with Country musicians like Brothers Osborne, Billy Currington, Jon Pardi, Lee Brice, Cody Johnson, Josh Turner, Gary Allan, Granger Smith, Carly Pearce, Parker McCollum, The Cadillac Three and more. The Powell Brothers are a national touring act performing on average 160 dates across 25 states every year.  The band performs at events in the United States including the 2019 World Series at Minute Maid Park in Houston, Texas, the Dallas Cowboys 2021 season home opener on Monday Night Football at AT&T Stadium in Arlington, Texas, the 2021 National Finals Rodeo at the Las Vegas Convention Center, the 2022 Houston Livestock Show & Rodeo at NRG Stadium in Houston, Texas and more.

Biography 

The Powell Brothers is an American Country group fronted by brothers Taylor Powell (lead vocals, guitar, bass) and Blake Powell (vocals, bass, guitar). With a unique blend of genres and thoughtful lyrics they have garnered and vast and diverse following. Releases include eleven singles, four EPs and one full-length album.

The Powell Brothers released 2022 "Buy A Ticket" on January 17. Buy A Ticket is an upbeat song about taking a trip "anywhere." The song makes the case that your most memorable trip may be one without a pre-planned destination. The best memories can be found in spontaneous adventures and living in the moment. The new single was co-written by brothers Taylor Powell and Blake Powell and recorded by The Powell Brothers in-house, using their own team at The Farm studios. The Farm is The Powell Brothers' recording studio and rehearsal space located outside of Houston, Texas.

During the shut-down in 2020 due to the Coronavirus pandemic, Taylor Powell, Blake Powell, Mike Bishop Smith (drums) and Blake Sessions (audio engineer & producer) got to work at The Farm. The band spent months hunkered down in this creative incubator writing and recording new music. The time together yielded a new, edgy, hard hitting sound with a major attitude, featuring electric guitar riffs backed by a driving drum beat and gritty bass tones.

The Powell Brothers, with their newly discovered sound, decided to re-record five songs from their catalogue of previously released material. The EP was titled "Twenty Twenty" to document the year the world changed forever and the new sound was born. The collection of tracks is best described as a pulse pounding, addictive musical elixir blending elements of County and Rock. The group followed-up "Twenty Twenty" with the release of "Hopeless" (2021) and "Buy A Ticket" (2022).

The Powell Brothers' music really comes to life in their high energy live show. The group is featured at major music festivals across the United States including performances at the Oregon Jamboree (Sweet Home, OR), Highway 30 Music Fest (Filer, ID), Bands In The Backyard (Pueblo, CO), Merchants & Music Festival (Fort Thomas, KY), Way Out West Fest (El Paso, TX), Ziegenbock Music Festival (Corpus Christi, TX), Oyster Ridge Music Festival (Kemmerer, WY), Sweet Pea Music Festival (Bozeman, MT), and Corn Palace Festival (Mitchell, SD) to name a few.

The group has shared the stage with Jon Pardi, Parker McCollum, Cody Johnson, Brothers Osborne, Carly Pearce, Gary Allan, Josh Tuner, Granger Smith, Trace Adkins, Big & Rich, The Cadillac Three, Billy Currington and more.
 
Taylor and Blake Powell have many interests outside of music, including sports. The brothers found a way to combine their passions for music and sports by performing at professional and collegiate sporting events, including recent pre-game concerts at Monday Night Football, MLB World Series, NFL Playoffs, NHL Draft, National Finals Rodeo, Las Vegas Bowl, Alamo Bowl, Armed Forces Bowl and Frisco Bowl. Additionally, Taylor and Blake Powell have performed our National Anthem at MLB ballparks across the country, including performances for the Houston Astros, San Diego Padres, Milwaukee Brewers, Texas Rangers, Detroit Tigers and Cincinnati Reds.

When asked about The Powell Brothers’ explosive growth and what the future holds, Taylor Powell states "It all boils down to this; good songs and good people. We are committed to the craft of songwriting. Our goal is to make every song and every album better than the last, and to surround ourselves with the best people." Blake Powell echoes his brother's thoughts and adds "Our goal is to deliver recorded music and live performances worthy of the love and support we are so blessed to receive."

Members 
 Taylor Powell (Lead Vocals, Guitar & Bass)
 Blake Powell (Guitar, Bass & Backing Vocals)
 Mike Smith (Drums & Backing Vocals)

Discography

References

External links
 official website www.PowellBrothersmusic.com

Country music groups from Texas
People from Kingwood, Texas
Musical groups from Houston
2014 establishments in Texas
Musical groups established in 2014
American multi-instrumentalists